Orland Harold "Ike" Harris (June 5, 1932−July 7, 2021) was an American politician from Texas who served in both houses of the Texas Legislature.

Biographical sketch
Harris was born June 5, 1932, in Denton, Texas. Harris graduated from the University of North Texas in 1954 with a degree in political science. He then served as an instructor pilot in the United States Air Force. He received an honorable discharge with the rank of Captain in 1957. He then earned a Bachelor of Laws from Southern Methodist University School of Law. He was elected to the Texas House of Representatives in 1962 as one of nine Republicans of 150 total members. He served a single term in the Texas House. In 1967, he was then elected to the Texas Senate joining party convert Henry Grover as one of two Republicans in that chamber. He served in the Senate until 1995. After the decennial redistricting, Harris was drawn into a district with fellow Republican and freshman Senator Florence Shapiro. Harris chose to retire. Shapiro succeeded Harris in the Texas Senate. Harris died in 2021.

References

1932 births
2021 deaths
Texas Republicans
Lawyers from Dallas
20th-century American politicians
University of North Texas alumni
United States Air Force officers
Dedman School of Law alumni